Atorada or Atoraí is a moribund Arawakan language of Brazil and Guyana. Henri Ramirez (2019) considers it to be a dialect of Wapishana.

References

Arawakan languages
Languages of Brazil
Languages of Guyana